Chorisoneura is a genus of cockroach in the family Ectobiidae. There are at least 90 described species in Chorisoneura.

Species
These 90 species belong to the genus Chorisoneura:

 Chorisoneura africana Borg, 1902
 Chorisoneura albifrons Princis, 1951
 Chorisoneura albonervosa Rehn, 1916
 Chorisoneura amazona Rehn, 1932
 Chorisoneura anisoura Hebard, 1922
 Chorisoneura annulicornis Princis, 1951
 Chorisoneura anomala Saussure & Zehntner, 1893
 Chorisoneura apolinari Hebard, 1933
 Chorisoneura argentina Brancsik, 1898
 Chorisoneura barbadensis Rehn & Hebard, 1927
 Chorisoneura barticae Hebard, 1921
 Chorisoneura bella Rocha e Silva & Aguiar, 1977
 Chorisoneura bilineata Princis, 1955
 Chorisoneura bisignata Rehn, 1917
 Chorisoneura bradleyi Hebard, 1933
 Chorisoneura brunneri Shelford, 1907
 Chorisoneura cabimae Hebard, 1920
 Chorisoneura calogramma (Walker, 1868)
 Chorisoneura carpenteri Roth, 1992
 Chorisoneura cassiphila (Rochebrune, 1883)
 Chorisoneura castanea Rocha e Silva, 1971
 Chorisoneura castaneolineata Rocha e Silva & Aguiar, 1977
 Chorisoneura catuabana Lopes & Oliveira, 2004
 Chorisoneura centralis Rocha e Silva & Aguiar, 1977
 Chorisoneura cistelina (Walker, 1868)
 Chorisoneura colorata Hebard, 1929
 Chorisoneura cristobalensis Roth, 1992
 Chorisoneura diaphana Princis, 1965
 Chorisoneura dimidiaticornis Saussure & Zehntner, 1893
 Chorisoneura discoidalis (Burmeister, 1838)
 Chorisoneura elegantula Hebard, 1926
 Chorisoneura excelsa Rocha e Silva & Lopes, 1977
 Chorisoneura exquisita Rehn, 1932
 Chorisoneura flavipennis Saussure & Zehntner, 1893
 Chorisoneura formosella Rehn & Hebard, 1927
 Chorisoneura fulgurosa Lopes & Oliveira, 2004
 Chorisoneura fulva Rocha e Silva & Aguiar, 1977
 Chorisoneura fuscipennis Hebard, 1920
 Chorisoneura galibi Hebard, 1926
 Chorisoneura gatunae Hebard, 1921
 Chorisoneura gemmicula Hebard, 1920
 Chorisoneura gracilis (Saussure, 1862)
 Chorisoneura guianae Hebard, 1921
 Chorisoneura heydei Bruijning, 1959
 Chorisoneura inquinata Saussure, 1869
 Chorisoneura inversa Hebard, 1926
 Chorisoneura itatiaiensis Rocha e Silva, 1957
 Chorisoneura janeirensis Princis, 1951
 Chorisoneura lata Rehn, 1916
 Chorisoneura latissima Rocha e Silva & Aguiar, 1977
 Chorisoneura levallonia Rocha e Silva & Lopes, 1977
 Chorisoneura lineatifrons Princis, 1948
 Chorisoneura lopesi Rocha e Silva, 1957
 Chorisoneura meinerti Princis, 1951
 Chorisoneura mimosa Lopes & Oliveira, 2004
 Chorisoneura minuta Saussure, 1869
 Chorisoneura morosa Shelford, 1907
 Chorisoneura multivenosa Saussure, 1869
 Chorisoneura mysteca (Saussure, 1862)
 Chorisoneura nigrifrons (Serville, 1838)
 Chorisoneura nigrostriga Hebard, 1929
 Chorisoneura nobilis Rocha e Silva & Aguiar, 1977
 Chorisoneura panamae Hebard, 1920
 Chorisoneura parishi Rehn, 1918
 Chorisoneura perloides (Walker, 1868)
 Chorisoneura perlucida (Walker, 1868)
 Chorisoneura personata Rehn, 1916
 Chorisoneura peruana Caudell, 1914
 Chorisoneura polita Rehn, 1916
 Chorisoneura poststriga (Walker, 1868)
 Chorisoneura pulcherrima Rehn, 1916
 Chorisoneura roppai Lopes & Oliveira, 2004
 Chorisoneura similis Princis, 1951
 Chorisoneura sinop Rocha e Silva & Aguiar, 1977
 Chorisoneura sordida Brunner von Wattenwyl, 1865
 Chorisoneura specilliger Hebard, 1920
 Chorisoneura splendida Hebard, 1926
 Chorisoneura strigifrons Hebard, 1926
 Chorisoneura stylata Hebard, 1926
 Chorisoneura surinama Saussure, 1868
 Chorisoneura taeniata Saussure & Zehntner, 1893
 Chorisoneura tessellata Rehn, 1916
 Chorisoneura texensis Saussure & Zehntner, 1893 (small yellow Texas cockroach)
 Chorisoneura thalassina Shelford, 1913
 Chorisoneura translucida (Saussure, 1864)
 Chorisoneura viridis Rocha e Silva & Aguiar, 1977
 Chorisoneura vitrifera (Walker, 1868)
 Chorisoneura vitrocincta (Walker, 1868)
 Chorisoneura vivida Rocha e Silva & Gurney, 1962
 Chorisoneura yaguas Rehn, 1932

References

Cockroaches
Articles created by Qbugbot